Purana pryeri is a cicada species that occurs in Borneo where it is found in lowland areas.

References

Leptopsaltriini
Hemiptera of Asia
Insects of Borneo
Insects described in 1881
Taxa named by William Lucas Distant